Tourves is a commune in the Var department in the Provence-Alpes-Côte d'Azur region in southeastern France.

Population

Twin towns — sister cities
Tourves is twinned with:

  Perinaldo, Italy (1993)

See also
Communes of the Var department

References

Communes of Var (department)